Ekhane Aakash Neel was a Bengali medical romantic drama series which aired on Star Jalsha. It was the remake of StarPlus Sanjivani. The serial was set in a nursing home, and is themed on the love between Dr. Ujaan Chatterjee, a respected and talented young doctor, and Hiya, a free-spirited girl who is the central heroine of the drama. In 2019, a reboot version Ekhane Aakash Neel (2019 TV series) premiered on Star Jalsha.

Plot
The male protagonist Dr. Ujan Chatterjee, a cardiologist by profession who lost his best friend and mentor, his mother when he was barely a boy and grew into an egotistic, rude, solitary man who preferred to remain cocooned in his own world, welcomed solitude to the point of extremity that he shunned out his own father and considered him an intruder. After successful completion of his medical studies in UK, he returned home and joined the 'Tulip' Nursing Home in Kolkata where once his father Dr. Amolendu Chatterjee- the renowned neurologist, used to work and was one of the pillars of its growth. After passing away of Dr. Richard O'Brien, the founder of the Nursing Home, his wife, Elina took over the responsibilities of running 'Tulip' and subsequently handed over charge of Tulip to her competent and efficient doctor-duo Dr. Moynak and Dr. Shomoresh Ganguly and moved to the hills.

Ujan joined Tulip and came to be known as one of the best surgeons of Kolkata. The nursing home was small; its facilities were limited; but it was one of the most reliable places in the city because of its dedicated staff and professionally advanced doctors. One day, in one of his solitary jaunts, to be with himself, Ujan went to Kurseong where, he saved a person's life by giving him timely medical treatment. The news spread in that sleepy little hill station. The priest of the local Church was Friend-Philosopher-Guide to Elina and in search of a Doctor, he heard of Ujan's feat and took him to Elina who had suddenly fallen seriously ill.

Ujan decided to shift Elina to Tulip as he found her in a pretty bad physical condition and in need of an immediate and complicated surgery—neither the patient nor the young Doctor realized  that they and their families knew each other since years. Elina had two daughters: her biological daughter, Annie and her adopted daughter, Hiya. Ujan first sighted Hiya in Kurseong when she was running in the hills with her kid friends and incidentally singing (a la Julie Andrews in The Sound of Music) his mother's song. They had a tiff later when Hiya's gang of buddies were taking a feel of Ujan's Binocular and as usual, he did not like that. What attracted Ujan to Hiya was her beautiful voice. He found his mother in Hiya's songs, because his Maa was a prolific singer and "full of life" – which is what was mesmerising about Hiya. In Kolkata, Elina's condition did not immediately improve even after the surgery; and as Hiya was lonely without her 'Monima' (Elina), she came to Kolkata to be with her and then as if a magic happened: Elina started to respond to the treatment.

Thus Hiya started her search of life in the concrete jungle of Kolkata. The foster-mother and the daughter had such a connection of their souls which even blood-connection many times can not have. In spite of continuous angry arguments & clashes over various issues in Tulip, the apparently visible antagonism was just a cover for the inward undeniable magical attraction that Ujaan & Hiya kept feeling for each other. It was as if all the events lead to their facing each other again & again. Hiya's search ended with her most beautiful tryst with Destiny - she fell in love with the outwardly rough-n-rude but inwardly caramel-kernel like soft Ujan and they had a "Mills & Boon inspiring dream-come-true" relationship. Ujan was attracted to her open mindedness and Hiya, to his abrupt-straightforward - principled approach to life. The magical bonding between the two, happened because of their shares of solitude in life which they lived through and the bonding intensified when Hiya had a near-fatal accident in which she had a nasty head-injury and slipped into comatose state. Knowing that paralysis was unavoidable, Amolendu performed a complicated surgery and saved her life. Post surgery seeing 'his sunshine' lying on a bed and wheelchair-bound Ujan was depressed and heartbroken. He finally pushed himself up just for her—not only to instill a zest for life in Hiya but moreover so to keep his "life-source" Hiya forever with him, he decided to marry her. Shortly before the Wedding, Hiya "walked again!" – thanks to Ujan's untiring efforts that his life (Hiya) lives a full and complete life again. A Hindu groom for a Christian bride. It was a wonderful wedding where vows were exchanged and garlands, too. There were no chanting of hymns or exchange of religious vows. Only songs of love and joy of life, only vows to love & cherish each other always. Angels too tiptoed in to bless them. On their wedding day, Manjari, daughter of Ujan's mother's friend reached Ujan's house. As expected, Ujan was astonished to see Mon (Pet name of Manjari, given by Ujan) after so many years because she remained only as a very special childhood friend to him with whom his  mother's precious memories were associated; though long back when they were kids, Aporna, Ujan's mother, wrote in a letter to Mon's mother her wish to see Mon as  her daughter-in-law. Now, Mon had sought him out after so many years due to her mother's serious condition. Her mother's condition worsened and Ujan had to go and operate her, leaving Hiya at home, in the middle of their Fulshojjya. Even after the operation she died and Ujan took the responsibilities of taking care of Mon. Here the story took a twist. Mon's desperate and unfulfilled desire of being Ujan's wife was unknown to both Ujan and Hiya; they accepted her as their  friend and ‘daughter’ of the Chatterjee Family; but all these good intentions did not have any meaning to Manjari. She wanted Ujan's love and Hiya's place in his life. So, Manjari started scheming and creating all sorts of practical problems in Ujan & Hiya's happy conjugal life; but  her schemings did not have any effect;  she started to feel frustrated and lonely. As a foil to Manjari, there was Dr. Romit Sen, Ujan's colleague at Tulip, who was always there as single man support system to Hiya and Ujan. He loved Hiya but never expressed it till he was about to leave the world because of Leukemia. Romit left his only daughter to his best friend Hiya and Ujan and they too accepted her as their child; but then, Romit's uncle appeared on the scene and took away Romit's daughter, Imli, with him to Kurseong. Hiya shared a very special bonding with Imli because Imli saw her own mother Sabina in Hiya; but when Imli went away, Hiya felt a deep void  within her and she wished to become a mother, in the real biological sense. Imli had arisened parental feelings in Ujan too and he also felt Hiya's agony; both of them started to plan about a family of their own. Their honeymoon was long overdue; so, they went to Pelling just after Christmas. They had a wonderful time, both mountain-lovers, as  Hiya was from the hills and Ujan was a trekker by hobby, they enjoyed the breathtaking scenery and relived their good old days, far from the madding crowd's ignoble strife. By that time in Kolkata, scheming Manjari had a co-hort in Vicky, Ujan's cousin brother and the two started to make plans to keep Ujan and Hiya in perpetual trouble. As if these two were not enough, in came established industrialist Ashok Kapoor with his sinister plan of either to take over "Tulip" or to start a whole new Nursing Home with all sorts of modern medical facilities, to be a tough competitor of "Tulip" which was by then synonymous with Health-Care in Kolkata. What Kapoor did not realize and was incomprehensible to business-minded folk like him, was that the secret of success of "Tulip" was not just its facilities but its cheerful and homely atmosphere, created by its dedicated staff and a bunch of  ever energized junior doctors who  were there to face any kind of emergency situation at any time of a day or night. As individuals, they used to enjoy their shares of good things of life but while on duty, they were untiring: Drs. Avro-Ayan-Saurav-Ranjan-Gogol-Madhushree-Kaushani-Nayana-Shahana: everyone of them were impatient to learn something new from their seniors; ever ready to assist each other and when Hiya came, they were the ones who befriended her and later became her loyal "knights-in-armour". If "Tulip" was the lifeline of wellness then these Doctors were the lifeline of "Tulip". Elina, because of her absolute faith on her staff and Doctors did not bend to Kapoor's subtle offer of buying her dream "Tulip"; then Kapoor  showed his true colours and involved Vicky-Manjari to convince Ujan to come to his Nursing Home: "Zeus" because he knew that Ujan was the main stay of "Tulip". Ujan saw through Kapoor and did not accept his offer. Again Manjari was forced to play a pivotal role to drag Ujan to "Zeus" and this time Ujan did not doubt his childhood friend's intentions:and agreed to her request to join Zeus as a confirmation of wanting to help her because previously, he  reproached  Mon antagonistically when she expressed her  bleak desire of love from him. Ultimately, the secret game of Kapoor came out in the open during the course of a path-breaking surgery, successfully done by Dr. Ujan Chatterjee, in "Zeus", and everyone's conscience came into play: Manjari discovered Kapoor's intention to keep Ujan at any cost; Ujan observed Kapoor's wrong ways of running a Nursing Home and Vicky-Manjari both realised Kapoor was using them to win this game to further his own ill intentions and grab all the limelight. Dr. Madhusree, who joined "Zeus" from "Tulip" to earn some more money for her Mother's treatment, and was the single witness to Kapoor's dangerous game plan, had a "face-off" with the planner himself. Her razor sharp comments and Ujan's refusal to accept any money after the surgery, awakened that hidden conscience in Kapoor who was a contemporary antagonist and was the real catalyst of all the murky & controversy embroiled situations. Though created by him nothing was ever proved against him rather these incidents became eye-openers for many, but nothing made any difference in that belief and love which was there between Ujan and Hiya. One fine day, it was known that Hiya was pregnant; Hiya, a "child- woman" who never knew her parents and was nurtured and loved by her foster mother, was happy beyond anyone's imagination; Ujan's love and affection showered on her at this happy hour and Elina's gift of  the responsibility of "Tulip", inspired Hiya to bring out of her mind's closet, that calm and matured woman who could gracefully handle both the responsibilities. But suddenly all those happy moments came to a grinding halt as Hiya had a miscarriage. It was traumatic not only for Hiya but for Ujan, also. And this trauma brought a sea-change in Manjari, too. She took the initiative to bring Hiya back to her normal self; she accepted Vicky in her life. In the meantime Hiya was diagnosed as having Myotonic Dystrophy-a genetic disorder, by her Gynaecologist Dr. Deepa who opined that it could be fatal for Hiya to conceive. Hiya's dreams dashed; but still she stood up because she wanted their child. While Ujan did not want to take any risk on Hiya because of the disorder, Hiya was desperate in love to gift back Ujan his lost childhood in the form of their baby. So she went away from Ujan to undergo treatment and make herself physically fit to conceive, obviously without leaving any trace to find her which again made Ujan dejected & life-less, as he was, before meeting Hiya. While Hiya was away, her lookalike, a 10/11-year-old girl, was admitted in "Tulip" and attracted Ujan's affection;  she was a patient of amnesia and during the course of her treatment, it was known that she had lost her parents in a road accident and her only family now was her aunt. Ujan named her Diya; took her to her aunt's home but when he learned that her aunt's family was going to send her to an orphanage, he decided to adopt her as his daughter. Ujan with Manjari's help announced his second marriage to Manjari, a ploy to bring Hiya back. Hiya came back from her self-imposed exile, accepted Diya as their daughter and after the birth of Hiya and Ujan's baby boy, they had their feel of a complete happy family: it was 'love is in the air' at the end of the series.

Cast

Crew
The directors are Anindo Banerjee and Joydeep Mukherjee. Executive producers are Indrani Mukherjee and Nishpal Singh, and producers are Aniruddho Roychoudhury and Jit Banerjee. The executive producer from STAR Jalsha is Aratrika Bhoumik. The title music was by Jeet Ganguly, with singer Monali Thakur. Camera operators were Premendu Bikash Chaki, Bapi Seth, and Suman Kumar Das.

Story, screenplay and dialogue
Anuja Chatterjee
 Aditi Majumdar
 Joy Mukherjee
 Kaushik Bhattacharya
 Joydeep Mukherjee
 Sayantani Majumdar Nambiar
 Joy Dasgupta

Production

Use of music and poems
Ekhane Akash Neel makes good use of sequence-synchronized poems and songs. The writings of filmmaker Satyajit Ray's grandfather, Upendrokishor Roy Choudhury, and his father, Sukumar Ray, were frequently sources. "Katukutuburo", "Ghyanghyanshur", "Gomratherium" and "Kumropotash" are a few examples. A noteworthy scene of this kind is when Imli describes everyone in Ujan's house as "Ha-Ja-Ba-Ra-La" (the Bengali equivalent of Alice in Wonderland).

Music was an integral part of the show as well. Tagore's songs were used in an innovative way that captured their appeal and flavour. One folk song which was often used in the series to portray a character's inner thoughts was "Amar Bhitaro Bahire Antaro Antarey Achho Tumi...". A few modern Bengali songs were also used. The song ami tomar sathe ekla hote chai became a hit, music directed by MUSIC Maestro of Bengal JEET GANNGULI....

Reception
In week 22 of 2020, the series has risen to second place with 1.379 million impressions for the most watched television series in Bengal.

References

External links
 

Star Jalsha original programming
Bengali-language television programming in India
2008 Indian television series debuts
2010 Indian television series endings